The Minneapolis Post Office is the central post office for the city of Minneapolis, Minnesota in the United States. Located on the west bank of the Mississippi River, the facility extends west to east from Hennepin Avenue Bridge to the Third Avenue Bridge and north to south from the West River Parkway on the Grand Rounds Scenic Byway to First Street. Its ZIP code is 55401.

History
Ard Godfrey operated the area's first post office in the village of Saint Anthony on the Mississippi's east bank during the early 1850s. At first unpredictably, deliveries came by messenger from Fort Snelling through Saint Paul, Minnesota. Later, mail arrived by stagecoach every ten to fourteen days. The first post office in Minneapolis was built on the west bank on High Street in 1854 and operated by postmaster Hezekiah Fletcher.

The present day post office was completed in 1933 and occupies nearly the same site. The main building faced Pioneer Square park, which is now occupied by an apartment tower. A companion federal office building at a right angle to the post office on the park's western perimeter was suggested in 1934 but not built.

A seven-level parking ramp and loading dock for bulk mail were added to the west in 1976.

Structure and interior

The post office was built of granite and stone in the PWA Moderne Art Deco style at the cost of $4.5 million or about $64 million in 2006 USD. Léon Eugène Arnal, the chief designer for the architects Magney & Tusler, designed the building. Between 1885 and 1946, Magney & Tusler designed the post office, and designed or co-designed the Foshay Tower downtown, the Calhoun Beach Club on Lake Calhoun, the Lehmann Center on Lake Street, the Young-Quinlan Department Store on the Nicollet Mall and the former home of Teener's Theatrical costume and props store on Hennepin Avenue among other buildings in Minneapolis. The firm was later known as Setter, Leach & Lindstrom, acquired by Leo A. Daly in 2003.

Its interior is unchanged and postal customers still utilize its original bronze teller cages and fixtures, marble terrazzo floor and sandstone walls. Perhaps the longest light fixture in the world, a 350-foot (107 m), 16-ton (16256.8 kg) bronze chandelier runs the length of the lobby, originally designed to regulate temperature.

Peepholes were installed in the corridors so that inspectors could protect the mail and observe employees. The main building contained a three-room suite paneled in walnut for the postmaster, recreation rooms and a hospital unit for employees as well as a rifle range in the basement.

References

Further reading

External links 

 

Government buildings completed in 1933
Art Deco architecture in Minnesota
Buildings and structures in Minneapolis
Post office buildings in Minnesota